Khachaturov is an Armenian surname. Notable people with the surname include:

Artyom Khachaturov (born 1992), Armenian football player 
Tigran Khachaturov (1906–1989), Armenian economist
Yuri Khachaturov (born 1952), Armenian military official

Armenian-language surnames